This is the results breakdown of the local elections held in Castile and León on 3 April 1979. The following tables show detailed results in the autonomous community's most populous municipalities, sorted alphabetically.

Overall

City control
The following table lists party control in the most populous municipalities, including provincial capitals (shown in bold).

Municipalities

Ávila
Population: 37,302

Burgos
Population: 145,473

León
Population: 120,761

Palencia
Population: 65,896

Ponferrada
Population: 52,488

Salamanca
Population: 141,474

Segovia
Population: 48,623

Soria
Population: 28,845

Valladolid
Population: 308,523

Zamora
Population: 54,819

References

Castile and León
1979